Alenino is a rural locality (a village) in Filippovskoye Rural Settlement, Kirzhachsky District, Vladimir Oblast, Russia. The population was 593 as of 2010. There are 39 streets.

Geography 
Alenino is located 21 km southwest of Kirzhach (the district's administrative centre) by road. Filippovskoye is the nearest rural locality.

References 

Rural localities in Kirzhachsky District